Academic Partnerships (AP) is a major for-profit online program manager (OPM) owned by Vistria Group, a private equity firm.  Established in 2007 by entrepreneur Randy Best, it claims to serve more than 50 colleges and universities, providing technology, marketing services, and student support services to mid-level brands. Because of its early start as an OPM, it has been considered "a pioneer" in the business. APs clients, which are mostly regional public universities, are lower in price than elite colleges, but face significant financial and enrollment challenges. According to Academic Partnerships, the company has served 270,000 students and converted more than 4000 campus-based classes to online courses.

History
In 2007, Academic Partnerships was created by entrepreneur Randy Best as Higher Ed Holdings. In 2007, Education Holdings helped Lamar University establish online programs, and quickly expanded to other universities including the University of Texas system and Arkansas State University. An article in Forbes characterized the company's efforts as "using the Web to turn struggling midlevel U.S. universities into global education brands."

In 2011, Randy Best hired former Florida Governor Jeb Bush as an adviser to Higher Ed Holdings.  Bush was also an investor. Using his connections, Bush was able to broker an education deal for AP with Florida International University

In 2013, Clayton Christensen, a Harvard Business School professor and creator of the theory of disruptive innovation  became a senior advisor to Academic Partnerships. Former executives at Academic Partnerships, Paxton Riter and  Whitney Kilgore, helped found another OPM, .

In March 2014, the firm paid Hillary Clinton $225,000 to deliver a speech. In his June 2014 speech to the Association of Private Sector Colleges and Universities, Bush called President Barack Obama's gainful employment regulations, “a sledgehammer to the entire field of higher education.” In December of that same year, Jeb Bush resigned from his position at AP in preparation for his bid for a 2016 presidential run.

In 2014, AP was characterized as a "profit machine" that could reduce the cost of educating an undergraduate by about 85 percent. By 2015, AP had annual sales of $100 million and contracts with 40 U.S. colleges and universities.

At some point, AP was owned by Insight Partners, a venture capital and private equity firm.

In 2017, the firm appointed Dan Branch, a former Texas House member and Chairman of the Texas House Committee on Higher Education to the board.

In 2019, Vistria Group, a Chicago-based equity firm, acquired Academic Partnerships for the Vistria II fund. Vistria has investments in a number of for-profit education assets, including Edmentum, Vanta Education, FullBloom Education, MSI Information Services, Apollo Education Group, and Unitek Learning.

In 2020, University of Texas-Arlington President Vistasp Karbhari resigned after taking two international trips paid by Academic Partnerships. The school paid AP "more than $178 million over about a five-year period."

In 2020, Academic Partnerships was one of five online program managers that Senators Elizabeth Warren and Sherrod Brown targeted for scrutiny. The senators said that online program managers were typically not transparent and that they were concerned that these OPMs might be violating rules meant to rein in for-profit colleges.

Business model
Academic Partnerships operates as an online program manager (OPM) and receives an undisclosed portion of the revenues. It is not directly involved in instruction and it does not confer degrees. Instead, it provides its clients with marketing, mentoring, instructional design, technology, and other services.

The firm  works with faculty and staff to design and deliver online programs; it uses digital, traditional and field sales channels to market and enroll students; and it   provides outreach to assist students with the application process, communicate with students, refer students to university services, and provide outreach to inactive students.

One criticism of this model is that college and university staff see this as a form of privatization.

Another criticism is that Academic Partnerships and other online program managers work in the shadows, with limited oversight and with little knowledge by faculty or students.

University partners

Arkansas State University
Avila University
Boise State University
Carleton University
Eastern Michigan University
Eastern Washington University
Emporia State University
Florida International University
Lamar University
Louisiana State University Shreveport
Norfolk State University
Northern Kentucky University
Radford University
St. Cloud State University
Southern Illinois University
Southern Oregon University
Southeastern Oklahoma State University
Texas A&M (International University) 
University of Illinois Springfield
University of Maine at Presque Isle
University of North Carolina Pembroke
University of Texas at Arlington
University of West Florida
William Paterson University
Youngstown State University

Data Raven
Data Raven is a technology that uses algorithms and artificial intelligence to improve recruitment and retention.

See also 
For-profit higher education in the United States
Online program manager
Randy Best

References

External links 
 Academic Partnerships

Higher education in the United States